Otto Karl Gessler (or Geßler) (6 February 1875 – 24 March 1955) was a liberal German politician during the Weimar Republic. From 1910 until 1914, he was mayor of Regensburg and from 1913 to 1919 mayor of Nuremberg. He served in numerous Weimar cabinets, most notably as Reichswehrminister (Minister of Defence) from 1920 to 1928.

Early life
Otto Karl Gessler was born on 6 February 1875 in Ludwigsburg in the Kingdom of Württemberg as the son of the non-commissioned officer Otto Gessler and his wife Karoline (née Späth). He finished school in 1894 with the Abitur at the Humanistisches Gymnasium in Dillingen an der Donau. He studied law in Erlangen, Tübingen and Leipzig and received his doctorate there in 1900. Initially, he  worked for the judicial service of Leipzig. He then moved to Bavaria and served in various positions in the Bavarian justiciary (1903 clerk in the Bavarian Ministry of Justice, 1904 prosecutor in Straubing, 1905 Gewerberichter in Munich) before moving into public administration. In 1903, Gessler married Maria Helmschrott (died 1954).

Political career

Empire and Weimar Republic
Gessler was mayor of Regensburg from 1910 to 1914 and lord mayor of Nuremberg from 1913 to 1919. Because of reduced mobility due to a handicap he did not serve during World War I. He successfully headed the town administration of Nuremberg in the war years and contributed to the fact that there were no leftist takeovers in Nuremberg and Franconia the immediate aftermath of the war during the German Revolution of 1918-19.

Gessler was close to Friedrich Naumann and became one of the founders of the DDP in November 1918. In October 1919, he was appointed as Reichsminister für Wiederaufbau (Minister for Reconstruction) in the cabinet of Gustav Bauer. Gessler was not a staunch supporter of the new republic, describing himself as a Vernunftsrepublikaner only.

After the Kapp-Lüttwitz Putsch in March 1920 he assumed the office of Reichswehrminister (Minister of Defence) from Gustav Noske who was forced to resign as a result of the putsch.

Gessler kept that position for the next eight years, despite numerous changes of government. As Reichswehrminister he worked closely with Chef der Heeresleitung Hans von Seeckt in setting up the Reichswehr and turning it into a modern army. Gessler did not see his role as controlling the military, but rather in cooperating with the military command staff, which for its part viewed the Reichswehr's position as an independent and autonomous "state within the state". From 1920 to 1924, Gessler was also a member of the Reichstag.

In September 1923, the right-wing state government of Bavaria challenged the government in Berlin, resulting in a so-called "Reichsexekution" against the state. President Friedrich Ebert declared a state-of-emergency and, as Reichswehrminister, Gessler was vested with executive power. After the Hitler Putsch in November, Gessler transferred that power to von Seeckt. He helped in solving the crisis, by mediating between Ebert, chancellor Gustav Stresemann and the military leadership. Later, Gessler created a new office, the Wehrmacht-Abteilung, directly under the Reichswehrminister and thereby moved political power from the Heeresleitung to the Minister.

From October to December 1925, Gessler also served as provisional Minister of the Interior and in May 1926 was Vice-Chancellor of Germany for a few days. In January 1927, the DDP voted against working with the coalition of the cabinet of Wilhelm Marx. To retain his position as Minister of Defence, Gessler left the party.

After the accusation of financial anomalies in his ministry associated with the secret re-armament of the Reichswehr (also known as the Phoebus scandal) Gessler was forced to resign in January 1928.

From 1928 to 1933, he was president of the Volksbund Deutsche Kriegsgräberfürsorge (German War Graves Commission) and of the Bund für die Erneuerung des Reiches. From 1931 to 1933, Gessler was president of the Verein für das Deutschtum im Ausland (VDA, today Verein für Deutsche Kulturbeziehungen im Ausland).

After 1933
After the Machtergreifung of the Nazis in 1933, he retired from politics, in part due to ill health, and at first lived in seclusion at Lindenberg im Allgäu. Later in World War II, however, he became a member of the resistance group around Franz Sperr, had contacts with the Kreisau Circle, was included the resistance’s 1944 plans, and, in the event that the coup succeeded, was slated to be political commissioner in Military District VII (Munich) in the shadow cabinet of General Ludwig Beck and Carl Friedrich Goerdeler. He was named in documents of Claus von Stauffenberg and was arrested two days after the assassination attempt on Adolf Hitler of 20 July 1944. He was detained and tortured at Ravensbrück concentration camp and then held at various Berlin prisons until his release in February 1945.

After the end of World War II, Gessler became involved in humanitarian organizations. In 1949, he became president of the Bavaria Red Cross (a post he retained until his death) and in 1950 president of the German Red Cross. He was instrumental in the post-war reconstruction of the organization, serving as president until 1952.

From 1950 to 1955, Gessler was member of the Bavarian senate.

Death and legacy
Gessler died on 24 March 1955 in Lindenberg im Allgäu. In 1958, his memoirs Reichswehrpolitik in der Weimarer Zeit were published posthumously.

The hospital in Lindenberg is named for Gessler.

Further reading

 Möllers, Heiner: Reichswehrminister Otto Geßler. Eine Studie zu "unpolitischer" Militärpolitik in der Weimarer Republik (= Europäische Hochschulschriften. Reihe 3. Geschichte und ihre Hilfswissenschaften. Bd. 794). Lang, Frankfurt am Main u.a. 1998, .

References

External links
 

 

1875 births
1955 deaths
People from Ludwigsburg
German Democratic Party politicians
Members of the Reichstag of the Weimar Republic
Ministers of the Reichswehr
Mayors of Regensburg
German War Graves Commission
People from the Kingdom of Württemberg
Knights Commander of the Order of Merit of the Federal Republic of Germany
Ravensbrück concentration camp survivors
German Red Cross personnel